Catwalk Dogs is a British television film written by Simon Nye and produced by Shed Productions for ITV. It stars Kris Marshall and Georgia Mackenzie and was first shown on 21 October 2007. Filming took place between 17 and 24 June in Teddington.

Plot
Catwalk Dogs is the story of Sally and Michael a couple who are coping with the trauma of miscarriage. The day Michael brings home pedigree puppy Archie it changes their lives forever. Archie is a Wire haired fox terrier.

With their relationship wavering under the emotional stress, Sally decides to leave Michael. As a bolt hole she moves in next door to her new-found doggie friend, Guy and his formidable mother, dog show judge and Rottweiler breeder, Mrs Jessop.

Michael goes to pieces when Sally leaves, losing his job and self-respect. He turns to Archie for solace and man's best friend leads him to the disparate but caring members of a local dog club who just might be able to help him win back Sally.

He then does.

Cast
 Kris Marshall as Michael
 Georgia Mackenzie as Sally
 Dominic Rowan as Guy
 Diana Quick as Guy's mother
 Dave Lamb as Colin
 Rose Keegan as Jilly
 Kevin Horkin as himself, Pet Expert

Reception
Catwalk Dogs had a rating of 4,920,000 viewers and ranked at #20 on ITV.

References

External links 
Catwalk Dogs at Shed Media

2007 television films
2007 films
British television films
Films directed by Tim Sullivan
ITV (TV network) original programming